Zhang Rongfang (born April 15, 1957) is a Chinese retired volleyball player and coach who competed in the 1984 Summer Olympics. She was a member of the Chinese volleyball team which won the gold medal, having played in all five matches.

Career
Lang was a member of the Chinese national team that won gold over the United States at the 1984 Summer Olympics in Los Angeles, California. She was also a member of the team that won World Championship crown in 1982 in Lima and World Cup title in 1981 in Osaka.

As a volleyball coach, Zhang led the women's Chinese national team to gold at the 1986 World Championship in Prague.

Personal life
Zhang is married to former volleyball player and coach Hu Jin, who also coached the women's national team between 1989-1993 and 1999-2001. They have a son together.

Awards

National team
 1981 World Cup -  Gold Medal
 1982 World Championship -  Gold Medal
 1984 Los Angeles Olympic Games -  Gold Medal

References

1957 births
Living people
Chinese women's volleyball players
Volleyball players at the 1984 Summer Olympics
Olympic volleyball players of China
Olympic gold medalists for China
Olympic medalists in volleyball
Asian Games medalists in volleyball
Volleyball players at the 1978 Asian Games
Volleyball players at the 1982 Asian Games
Medalists at the 1984 Summer Olympics
Volleyball players from Henan
People from Zhumadian
Medalists at the 1978 Asian Games
Medalists at the 1982 Asian Games
Asian Games gold medalists for China
Asian Games silver medalists for China
Chinese volleyball coaches
20th-century Chinese women